Jarbas Faustinho (born 21 September 1939 in Rio de Janeiro) commonly known as just Cané is a Brazilian former professional footballer and coach. Although born in Brazil, Cané played the majority of his football career in Italy.

At club level he played as a winger for S.S.C. Napoli and Bari amongst many other teams. As a coach, he managed several clubs in the Province of Naples area. In 1975, played in the National Soccer League with Montreal Castors where he served as a player-coach. He returned to Montreal for the 1976 NSL season. 

After taking over as head coach of Napoli in 1994, Cané became the first black coach in Serie A history.

Honours

Club
Napoli
Coppa delle Alpi (1): 1966

Individual
Coppa Italia – Top scorer: 1964–65 (3 goals)

References

1939 births
Living people
Serie A players
Serie B players
Olaria Atlético Clube players
S.S.C. Napoli players
S.S.C. Bari players
S.S.C. Napoli managers
A.S.D. Sorrento managers
S.S. Juve Stabia managers
Brazilian expatriate footballers
Expatriate footballers in Italy
Footballers from Rio de Janeiro (city)
Brazilian footballers
Montreal Castors players
Association football midfielders
S.S. Ischia Isolaverde managers
Canadian National Soccer League coaches
Canadian National Soccer League players
Brazilian football managers
Serie A managers